America America (British title The Anatolian Smile—a reference to an ongoing acknowledgment of the character Stavros' captivating smile) is a 1963 American drama film directed, produced and written by Elia Kazan, adapted from his own book, published in 1962.

Inspired by the life of his uncle, Avraam Elia Kazantzoglou, Kazan used little-known cast members, with the entire storyline revolving around the central performance of Greek actor Stathis Giallelis, twenty-one years old at the time of production, who is in virtually every scene of the nearly three-hour movie. America America is one of Martin Scorsese’s favorite films. In 2001, America, America was included in the annual selection of 25 motion pictures added to the National Film Registry of the Library of Congress being deemed "culturally, historically, or aesthetically significant" and recommended for preservation.

Plot
In the late 1890s, Cappadocian Greek Stavros Topouzoglou (Giallelis) lives in an impoverished village below Mount Argaeus in Ottoman Turkey. The life of the Cappadocian Greeks and Armenians of Kayseri is depicted, including the Derinkuyu Underground City traditional cliff cave dwellings in which Stavros' grandmother lives.

Stavros witnesses the Hamidian massacres against Armenians which leave his friend, Vartan, dead. Vartan and Stavros had been planning to go to America together. Stavros is nearly imprisoned after trying to recover Vartan's corpse. Knowing that the Greeks won't remain safe from violence forever, the family sends Stavros to Constantionople. Stavros is entrusted by his father with the family's financial resources in a mission of hope to the Turkish capital Constantinople (renamed Istanbul in 1930), where he is to work in the carpet business of his father's cousin (Harry Davis), although his own dream is to reach the faraway land of opportunity – America.

His odyssey begins with a long voyage on a donkey and on foot through the impoverished towns and villages on the way to Constantinople. Out of his naivete, he loses all the money and arrives at the cousin's home penniless. The older man is deeply disappointed at this turn of events since he was counting on the infusion of funds to rescue his failing carpet store. Nevertheless, he attempts to salvage the situation by proposing that Stavros marry a wealthy merchant's (Paul Mann) young daughter (Linda Marsh). Stavros realizes that such a marriage would mean the end of his American dream and adamantly refuses, abruptly leaving the angry cousin.

Now homeless on the streets of the capital, Stavros survives by eating discarded food and working at backbreaking and hazardous jobs. After nearly a year of scrimping and self-denial, he has some savings, but his first sexual encounter with a young prostitute (Joanna Frank) leaves him, once again, penniless. Sinking even lower, he now finds himself living in an overcrowded subterranean hovel, which becomes a scene of chaos and bloodshed when it is attacked with gunfire by authorities purportedly searching for anarchists and revolutionaries. Severely injured in the mayhem, the unconscious Stavros is thrown among piles of dead bodies slated for disposal into the sea. He subsequently topples from the cart transporting the bodies and painfully makes his way to the cousin's residence. The relative takes pity on the young man and allows him to recover at his home. Deprived now of all resistance, Stavros agrees to marry his intended bride. Upon being questioned by her regarding his moodiness, however, he admits that he still plans to emigrate to America, using the dowry money to pay for his passage.

At this point Stavros becomes reacquainted with Hohannes (Gregory Rozakis), a young Armenian, whom Stavros aided with food and clothing during his original voyage to Istanbul. Hohannes informs him that he is being sponsored to America by an employer seeking labor. Stavros manages to secure his own passage with the aid of the middle-aged wife (Katharine Balfour) of wealthy Armenian-American businessman Artoon Kebabian (Robert H. Harris), a client of his prospective father-in-law.  He tells his intended bride that he cannot marry her, and subsequently embarks on the voyage on board SS Kaiser Wilhelm.

There is, however, another major impediment. Kebabian, enraged to learn of a shipboard affair between his wife and Stavros, lodges a criminal complaint against him and rescinds his offer of a job in America, threatening Stavros with deportation back to Turkey. However, as everything looks bleak, Hohannes, who is discovered by the immigration services to be afflicted with tuberculosis, jumps off the ship out of the realization he can never enter America. This sacrifice enables Stavros to take Hohannes' place.

With the climactic image of the Statue of Liberty as the boatload of immigrants docks in New York Harbor, Stavros puts his tribulations behind him, starting out as a shoeshine boy and gathering the pennies and dollars that will eventually bring his family to the land where their descendants, including Elia Kazan, will have the chance to fulfill their potential.

Elia Kazan's closing narration
"And he did bring them. It took a number of years, but one by one, he brought them here. Except for his father. That old man died where he was born.

"This film was made in Turkey and Greece.

"It was photographed by Haskell Wexler. It was edited by Dede Allen. The production designer was Gene Callahan. The costuming by Anna Hill Johnstone. The music was composed by Manos Hadjidakis. All under the management of Charles Maguire. And here are the actors: Stathis Giallelis, Frank Wolff, Harry Davis, Elena Karam, Estelle Hemsley, Gregory Rozakis, Lou Antonio, Salem Ludwig, John Marley, Joanna Frank, Paul Mann, Linda Marsh, Robert Harris, Katharine Balfour."

Cast
 Stathis Giallelis as Stavros Topouzoglou
 Frank Wolff as Vartan Damadian
 Harry Davis as Isaac Topouzoglou
 Elena Karam as Vasso Topouzoglou
 Estelle Hemsley as Grandmother Topouzoglou
 Gregory Rozakis as Hohannes Gardashian
 Lou Antonio as Abdul
 Salem Ludwig as Odysseus Topouzoglou
 John Marley as Garabet
 Joanna Frank as Vartuhi
 Paul Mann as Aleko Sinnikoglou
 Linda Marsh  as Thomna Sinnikoglou
 Robert H. Harris as Aratoon Kebabian
 Katharine Balfour as Sophia Kebabian
Uncredited:
 Giorgos Foundas
 Dimitris Nikolaidis

Awards and nominations

Production
The production, hampered by loss of its original financial backers, on-location hostility from Turkish authorities and onlookers, as well as other problems, continued into 1963. Powerful elements within Turkey came to be convinced that the country's national institutions and historical perspective upon turn of the 20th century events would be unfavorably portrayed by the Greek director and, when Kazan decided to transfer the troubled production to Greece, customs officials confiscated the cans of what they considered to be finished film, but owing to a prescient switch of labels between exposed and unexposed product, the valuable cargo survived.

Technical details, premiere dates and DVD release
America America was filmed in 1.66:1 aspect ratio on 35-millimeter film and had its New York premiere on December 15, 1963. Kazan makes a voice-only introduction during the opening scenes, a short voice-only epilogue in the closing scene, and a voice-over recitation of the lead actors and technical personnel of the film. It was filmed on location at the Alfa Studios in Athens, Greece, as well in rural Greece, Istanbul, New York City, and at the Warner Bros. Studios in Hollywood. Between summer 1964 and spring 1965, it was seen in virtually every major Western European city. Its VHS release came on November 28, 1994, and a French (region 2) DVD boxed set (with Kazan's Baby Doll and A Face in the Crowd) was released on December 3, 2002. The film was finally released by Warner Bros. on DVD in the US on February 8, 2011.

References

External links
 
 
 
 
 
 "America, America" essay by Daniel Eagan in America's Film Legacy: The Authoritative Guide to the Landmark Movies in the National Film Registry, A&C Black, 2010. ,  pp. 595–596

1963 films
1963 drama films
American black-and-white films
American drama films
1960s English-language films
Films about immigration to the United States
Films whose art director won the Best Art Direction Academy Award
Films whose director won the Best Director Golden Globe
Films directed by Elia Kazan
Films set in the Ottoman Empire
Films set in Istanbul
Films set in New York City
Films shot in Greece
Films shot in Athens
Films shot in Turkey
United States National Film Registry films
Films scored by Manos Hatzidakis
Warner Bros. films
1960s American films